H. mitchelli may refer to:
 Hemirrhagus mitchelli, Gertsch, 1982, a spider species in the genus Hemirrhagus and the family Theraphosidae found in Mexico
 Hyperolius mitchelli, a frog species found in Malawi, Mozambique and Tanzania

See also
 Mitchelli (disambiguation)